Gábor Kapuvári (born 17 January 1974) is a Hungarian wrestler. He competed in the men's freestyle 85 kg at the 2000 Summer Olympics.

References

External links
 

1974 births
Living people
Hungarian male sport wrestlers
Olympic wrestlers of Hungary
Wrestlers at the 2000 Summer Olympics
Martial artists from Budapest